The Shoppe was an American country music group from Dallas, Texas, composed of Mark Cathey (vocals), Kevin Bailey (vocals), Roger Ferguson (guitar), Clarke Wilcox (banjo), Mike Caldwell (harmonica), Jack Wilcox (bass), and Lou Chavez (drums).

The band's highest-charting single, "Doesn't Anybody Get High on Love Anymore," reached the Top 40 on the Billboard Hot Country Singles chart in 1981. They were signed to MTM Records in 1985 and released one album, The Shoppe, which charted on the Billboard Top Country Albums chart and led to appearances on The Nashville Network.

For nearly three decades, The Shoppe toured extensively throughout the United States before disbanding in 1998.

For many years The Shoppe was a mainstay at the Puyallup Fair, performing several times a day.

In 2012 The Shoppe reunited for a reunion run at the Puyallup Fair, from September 17 to September 23. They would also reunite for the Puyallup fair in 2013, and one final time in 2018 to celebrate their 50th anniversary.

Limited discography

Albums

Singles

References

External links
[ The Shoppe] at allmusic
 The Shoppe's Facebook page

Country music groups from Texas
MTM Records artists
Musical groups from Dallas
Musical groups established in 1968
Musical groups disestablished in 1998
Musical groups reestablished in 2012